Taiwan Shoufu University (TSU) is a private university in Madou District, Tainan, Taiwan, and runs independently with 2 hotels in Kaohsiung.

TSU offers a variety of undergraduate and graduate programs in fields such as engineering, management, social sciences, and humanities.

TSU also has a number of research centers and institutes focused on areas such as sustainable energy, smart agriculture, and digital transformation.

History 
The university was originally established as Diwan College of Management in 2000. In 2010, the college was accredited and upgraded to Taiwan Shoufu University. In 2019, the university had an enrollment rate of 52.10%. In September 2022, the Ministry of Education ordered the university to improve their performance until May 2024 or they will risk to be closed down.

The current president is Kuang-Hua, Hsu(). The Chairman of university board is Ciu-Feng, Ying.

Faculties 
There are eighteen departments categorized as three colleges, which are:
 College of Education and Design
 College of Leisure Industry
 College of Hotel Management

Campus
The university campus building is constructed on a land belongs to Taiwan Sugar Corporation.

References

External links

 Website of the Taiwan Shoufu University

2000 establishments in Taiwan
Educational institutions established in 2000
Universities and colleges in Tainan